The 2024 Pennsylvania Attorney General election will be held on , to elect the Attorney General of the U.S. state of Pennsylvania.

Attorney General Josh Shapiro, who was re-elected in 2020, was ineligible to seek a third term in 2024 due to term limits. He successfully ran for Governor of Pennsylvania in 2022.

In accordance with Article IV, Section 8 of the Pennsylvania Constitution, upon taking office as governor Shapiro will be permitted to nominate his successor as attorney general, who will serve the remaining two years of the term after being confirmed by the Senate. By tradition, an appointed attorney general agrees not to run for the post in the next election. In the interim between Shapiro's resignation to become governor and the appointee's installation, first deputy attorney general Michelle Henry will serve as acting attorney general.

Democratic primary

Candidates

Publicly expressed interest 
 Keir Bradford-Grey, former Philadelphia chief public defender (2015–2022)

Potential 
 Joe Khan, Bucks County solicitor (2020–2023) and candidate for Philadelphia district attorney in 2017
 Jared Solomon, state representative from the 202nd district (2017–present)
 Jack Stollsteimer, Delaware County district attorney (2019–present)

Declined
 Michelle Henry, acting attorney general (2023–present)

Republican primary

Candidates

Publicly expressed interest 

Potential 
 Scott Brady, former U.S. Attorney for the Western District of Pennsylvania (2017–2021)
 Bill McSwain, former U.S. Attorney for the Eastern District of Pennsylvania (2018–2021) and candidate for governor of Pennsylvania in 2022
 Natalie Mihalek, state representative from the 40th district (2019–present)
 David Sunday, York County District Attorney (2018–present)
 Nicole Ziccarelli, Westmoreland County District Attorney (2022–present)

See also 

 2024 Pennsylvania elections

References 

Attorney General
Pennsylvania Attorney General elections
Pennsylvania